The men's 1000 metres speed skating competition of the Vancouver 2010 Olympics was held at the Richmond Olympic Oval on 17 February 2010.

Records
Prior to this competition, the existing world and Olympic records were as follows.

No new world or Olympic records were set during this competition.

Results

Legend
RS – Reskate

References

External links
 

Men's speed skating at the 2010 Winter Olympics